More Power may refer to:

 MORE Electric and Power Corporation ("MORE Power" for short), Philippine electric power company
 More Power! (album), a 1969 album by Dexter Gordon
 "More Power" (song), a 2022 song by Liam Gallagher off the album C'mon You Know
 More Power (TV series), a 2022 History Channel documentary TV show starring Tim Allen and Richard Karn and toolgirl April Wilkerson, a sequel to the 2021 competition series Assembly Required, and a spin-off to sitcom Home Improvement and formatted similarly to the show-within-a-show segment renovation show Tool Time
 "more power!", a catchphrase by Tim Allen from the TV sitcom Home Improvement (TV series)

See also

 Power (disambiguation)
 More (disambiguation)